John Tatum (born c. 1935) is a former Canadian football player who played for the Edmonton Eskimos. He played college football at the University of Texas.

References

1930s births
Living people
Canadian football offensive linemen
Texas Longhorns football players
Edmonton Elks players